Arnaud Brihay is a Belgian artist, born in Marche-en-Famenne in 1972. He lives and works in Lyon, France.

Solo exhibitions
2010
 "Privacy, from private intimacy to urban intimacies". Photography at Le Quai des Arts, Les Subsistences, Lyon.
2009
 "happiness_and_Bliss v1.0". Installation at Galerie Caroline Vachet, for the festival Nuit des Lumières, Lyon, France.

Group exhibitions
2012
 Domination, Hegemony and The Panopticon. Works from The Farook Collection at Traffic Art Center, Dubai, UAE.
2011
 THE STATE: The Coming Insurrection at Traffic Art Center, Dubai, UAE. Curated by Rami Farook
 First Exhibition of European Contemporary Art of La Coupole - Paris, France.
2010
 "brussels is underground meets la providence all stars", photography installation and video, Belgium.
 "Picturing Cities", photography, at the Xuhui Museum of Art for the Universal Exhibition Shanghai 2010, China.
 "Summer Time", photography, at Galerie Caroline Vachet, Lyon, France.
 "Rouge!", photography, at the gallery Le Bocal, Lyon, France
 "Group Show", photography, at the IESA, Brussels, Belgium

Biennials
2010
 "US Today and after", photography, at the "9Ph Septembre de la Photographie", Photography Biennial 2010, Lyon, France.
2009
 "Wandering Around", photography, in Résonance of the Biennial of Contemporary Art of Lyon, France.

Art Fairs
2009
 Cutlog Art Fair, off FIAC, Paris, France

Collections
 Belgian General Consulate, Shanghai, China
 ECNU School of Design, Shanghai, China

References

External links
 POLA.BE, Artist's online portfolio

1972 births
Living people
Belgian artists
Belgian photographers